Corey Johnson may refer to:

 Corey Johnson (actor) (born 1961), American actor
 Corey Johnson (American football) (born 1973), former American football player
 Corey Johnson (basketball) (born 1996), Canadian basketball player
 Corey Johnson (politician) (born 1982), former Speaker of the New York City Council
 Corey Johnson (rugby league) (born 2000), English rugby league player
 Sunspot Jonz, American rapper born Corey Johnson

See also
Cory Johnson (disambiguation)